Ali Khvajeh (also Romanized as ‘Alī Khvājeh) is a village in Benajuy-ye Gharbi Rural District, in the Central District of Bonab County, East Azerbaijan Province, Iran. At the 2006 census, its population was 1,418, in 348 families.

References 

Populated places in Bonab County